Dmitri Vyacheslavovich Michkov (born 22 January 1980) is a Russian football coach and retired footballer who works as an assistant coach for Russian club Baltika Kaliningrad.

Playing career
On 19 December he moved from FC Tom Tomsk to FC Rubin Kazan which was confirmed by Rubin official website. But later the transfer fell through.

Coaching career
After retiring as a player, Michkov went into coaching work and is the analyst at Baltika Kaliningrad.

External links
  Player page on the official FC Tom Tomsk website
 

1980 births
People from Klimovsk
Living people
Russian footballers
Russia under-21 international footballers
FC Fakel Voronezh players
Servette FC players
FC Rubin Kazan players
FC Tom Tomsk players
PFC Spartak Nalchik players
Russian expatriate footballers
Expatriate footballers in Belgium
Expatriate footballers in Switzerland
Russian Premier League players
FC Shinnik Yaroslavl players
FC SKA-Khabarovsk players
FC Vityaz Podolsk players
Association football midfielders
K.R.C. Zuid-West-Vlaanderen players
FC Krasnodar players
FC Sportakademklub Moscow players
Sportspeople from Moscow Oblast